Chagan is a rural locality (a selo) and the administrative center of Chagansky Selsoviet, Kamyzyaksky District, Astrakhan Oblast, Russia. The population was 1,464 as of 2010. There are 33 streets.

Geography 
Chagan is located 32 km northwest of Kamyzyak (the district's administrative centre) by road. Posyolok moryakov and Volgo-Kaspiysky are the nearest rural localities.

References 

Rural localities in Kamyzyaksky District